The Pierce-Arrow car brand, produced from 1901 to 1938, was known for having one of the first Town Cars, or open coach designs, beginning in 1905. Pierce-Arrow Town Cars were predominantly owned by the very wealthy, including the royal families of Japan, Persia, Saudi Arabia, Greece, and Belgium. Town Cars were produced in various models: Brougham Town Car, Metropolitan Town Car and the Limousine Landau Town Car.

Models
 1905: The first Town Car was introduced. Their distinctive radiator design first appeared in this model and remained in Pierce-Arrows until the last car was manufactured. Features included gas lamps, double wind-shield and luxurious coach work.
 1921: The Limousine Landau was produced. This car had greater comfort and all-weather motoring by producing more cars of the closed type. This car seated seven passengers and was one of Pierce-Arrow's finest in the early 1920s.
 1934: The Metropolitan Town Car was mounted on either the eight- or twelve-cylinder Pierce-Arrow chassis. The eight cylinder model had 150 horsepower. The twelve cylinder model had 185 horsepower.

External links

 1936 Pierce-Arrow Town Car

Cars of the United States
Town Car